The 2011 Woking Borough District Council election was held on 5 May 2011 to elect members of the Woking Borough Council of the 13 open seats, the Conservative Party won 9 with 49.30% of the vote.

Election result

Ward results

References

2011 English local elections
2011
2010s in Surrey